Noldo is a genus of proturans in the family Acerentomidae.

Species
 Noldo kaprusii Shrubovych & Szeptycki, 2006
 Noldo submontanus Szeptycki, 1988

References

Protura